This is a list of fellows of the Royal Society elected in 1982.

Fellows

James Derek Birchall  (1930–1995)
William Maxwell Cowan  (1931–2002)
Ulrich Wolfgang Arndt  (1924–2006)
Anthony David Bradshaw  (d. 2008)
Amos Henry Chilver Baron Chilver of Cranfield (d. 2012)
Rodney James Baxter
Sir Michael Victor Berry
Lawrence Michael Brown
Daniel McGillivray Brown
Bryan Campbell Clarke
Alan William Cuthbert
John Thomas Finch
Henry Edgar Hall
Michael Hart
Eric John Hewitt  (1919–2002)
Sir Charles Antony Richard Hoare
Robert Francis Hudson  (d. 2012)
William Johnson
Kenneth Langstreth Johnson
 Sir Peter Julius Lachmann
Ralph Lainson
Michael Francis Land
Peter John Lawrenson
William Russell Levick
Stephen Finney Mason  (d. 2007)
Noreen Elizabeth Murray  (1935–2011)
Sir Gustav Joseph Victor Nossal
William James Peacock
Phillip James Edwin Peebles
Peter Rainger
Chintamani Nagesa Ramachandra Rao
Lewis Edward John Roberts  (d. 2012)
George Stanley Rushbrooke  (1915–1995)
John George Sclater
Graeme Bryce Segal
David Rostron Trentham
Stewart Turner, geophysicist
Thomas Gaskell Tutin  (1908–1987)
Ronald Harry Ottewill  (d. 2008)
John Conrad Waterlow  (d. 2010)

Foreign members

David Hunter Hubel (1926–2013)
Evgenii Mikhailovich Lifshitz  (1915–1985)
Warner Tjardus Koiter  (1914–1997)
Torsten Nils Wiesel

References

1982
1982 in science
1982 in the United Kingdom